Eileen Elizabeth Dailly (February 15, 1926 – January 17, 2011) was an educator and political figure in British Columbia, Canada. She represented Burnaby North in the Legislative Assembly of British Columbia from 1966 to 1986 as a New Democratic Party (NDP) member.

She was born Eileen Elizabeth Gilmore, the daughter of Joseph Gilmore and Mary Scott, in Vancouver, British Columbia and taught school for ten years in British Columbia. In 1951, she married James Dailly. She served ten years as a school trustee and was chairman of the Burnaby School Board for four years. In the assembly, Dailly served as deputy premier and as Minister of Education. As education minister, she banned corporal punishment in schools in 1973; she also introduced mandatory kindergarten and created the first First Nations school board in the province (School District 92 Nisga'a). She retired from politics in 1986. From 1988 to 1991, she hosted a senior's program on community cable television called "Coming of Age".

Dailly died on Salt Spring Island at the age of 84 from complications following skin cancer surgery.

References 

1926 births
2011 deaths
British Columbia New Democratic Party MLAs
British Columbia school board members
Canadian schoolteachers
Women government ministers of Canada
Deputy premiers of British Columbia
Members of the Executive Council of British Columbia
Politicians from Vancouver
Women MLAs in British Columbia
20th-century Canadian politicians
20th-century Canadian women politicians